Subis is a district in Miri Division, Sarawak, Malaysia.

Federal Parliament and State Assembly Seats 

List of Subis district representatives in the Federal Parliament (Dewan Rakyat)

List of Subis district representatives in the State Legislative Assembly of Sarawak

References 

Districts of Sarawak
Miri Division